was the fifth of ten s, built for the Imperial Japanese Navy under the Circle One Program (Maru Ichi Keikaku).

History
Despite being one of the most powerful classes of destroyers in the world at the time of their completion, none survived the Pacific War.
Samidare, built at the Uraga Dock Company was laid down on 19 December 1934, launched on 6 July 1935 and commissioned on 19 January 1937.

Operational history
From January 1942, Samidare participated in operations in the Netherlands East Indies, including the invasions of Tarakan, Balikpapan and eastern Java. During the Battle of the Java Sea, Samidare engaged a group of Allied destroyers and cruisers. Returning to Subic Bay in the Philippines on 16 March, Samidare assisted in the blockade of Manila Bay and the invasion of Cebu, returning to Yokosuka for repairs in early May. During the Battle of Midway on 4–6 June, Samidare was part of the Midway Occupation Force under Admiral Nobutake Kondō.

From mid-June, Samidare deployed from Kure via Singapore and Mergui for raiding operations in the Indian Ocean, but the operation was cancelled due to reverses suffered by the Imperial Japanese Navy in the Solomon Islands. Samidare was escort for the battleship  at the Battle of the Eastern Solomons on 24 August. For most of the month of September Samidare was escort for the seaplane tender , scouting the Solomon Islands and Santa Cruz Islands for potential seaplane bases, returning to Palau as the end of the month. In October, Samidare escorted troop convoys to Guadalcanal, and was slightly damaged in an air strike on 14 October by a near-miss. However, she was still combat-capable and conducted a "Tokyo Express" high speed transport run to Guadalcanal and a gunfire support mission as well as participating briefly in the Battle of the Santa Cruz Islands on 26 October under Admiral Takeo Kurita.

After repairs at Truk, Samidare was assigned to the Bombardment Force of Rear Admiral Abe Hiroaki, participating in the First Naval Battle of Guadalcanal on the night of 12–13 November 1942. Although entering combat late in the battle, she assisted in sinking the destroyer  and damaging the cruiser . After the battle, she rescued the 207 survivors from her sister ship Yūdachi, which she unsuccessfully attempted to scuttle with torpedoes.

After the battle, she rescued survivors from the sinking battleship , reaching Truk on 18 November. At the end of the month, she returned to Yokosuka for repairs. At the end of December, she returned to Truk as escort for the heavy cruiser .

In mid-January 1943, Samidare escorted the aircraft carrier  from Truk to Palau and Wewak, and after covering troop evacuation runs out of Guadalcanal in February, was assigned to covering troop transport operations to New Guinea, Kolombangara and Tuluvu through the end of April. She returned to Yokosuka on 6 August with the cruiser  for repairs. During the Battle of Vella Lavella on 6–7 October, Samidare torpedoed the destroyer . After continuing with troop evacuation missions throughout October, Samidare was in the Battle of Empress Augusta Bay on 2 November. During the battle, Samidare torpedoed the destroyer  but suffered medium damage from two shell hits and a collision with her sister ship  which damaged her bow. She returned to Yokosuka Naval Arsenal for repairs by mid-December.

In April 1944, Samidare escorted troop convoys from Japan to Saipan and on the Truk and Palau. On 27 April, she assisted in the rescue of survivors from the torpedoed cruiser . In May and early June, Samidare covered troop evacuations from Biak and other locations in the Netherlands East Indies. She participated in the Battle of the Philippine Sea on 19–20 June as part of Admiral Takatsugu Jōjima's task force. However, on 18 August, Samidare ran aground on the Velasco Reef near Palau Island at position . On 25 August, she was torpedoed by the submarine . The destroyer broke in two with her stern-section sinking, and the bow-section later destroyed by the Japanese.

Notes

References

 OCLC 77257764

External links

Shiratsuyu-class destroyers
World War II destroyers of Japan
World War II shipwrecks in the Pacific Ocean
Ships built by Uraga Dock Company
Ships sunk by American submarines
1935 ships
Maritime incidents in August 1944